Murdoch Mysteries is a Canadian television drama series that premiered on Citytv on January 20, 2008, and currently airs on CBC. The series is based on characters from the Detective Murdoch novels by Maureen Jennings and stars Yannick Bisson as the fictional William Murdoch, a police detective working in Toronto, Ontario in the late 19th and early 20th centuries. The series was titled The Artful Detective on the Ovation cable TV network in the United States, until season twelve.

Synopsis 

The series takes place in Toronto starting in 1895 and follows Detective William Murdoch (Yannick Bisson) of the Toronto Constabulary, who solves many of his cases using methods of detection that were unusual at the time. These methods include fingerprinting (referred to as "finger marks" in the series), blood testing, surveillance, and trace evidence.

Some episodes feature anachronistic technology whereby Murdoch sometimes uses the existing technology of his time to improvise a crude prototype of a technology that would be more readily recognizable to the show's 21st-century audience. In one episode, for instance, he creates a primitive version of sonar to locate a sunken ship in Lake Ontario. In still another, a foreign police officer has a photograph that Murdoch needs as evidence, so Murdoch asks the other officer to overlay the photograph with a grid numerically coded for the colour in each square, and to transmit the numerical data to Murdoch via telegraph—with the result that the foreign officer has essentially sent Murdoch a bitmap image they call a "facsimile"—a telefax. This aspect of the show has been described as introducing elements of the steampunk genre of science fiction, although it is not a standard theme of all episodes.

Detective Murdoch is assisted by the three other main characters: Inspector Brackenreid (Thomas Craig), Doctor Julia Ogden (Hélène Joy), and the inexperienced but eager Constable George Crabtree (Jonny Harris), who aspires to be a mystery novel writer. Brackenreid, Murdoch's immediate superior, is a blunt and sceptical Yorkshireman with a fondness for whisky who prefers conventional methods of detection over Murdoch's eccentric methods, though he is typically pleased and proud when Murdoch is successful despite the odds. Crabtree is often unable to grasp the more advanced methods, but his enthusiasm and loyalty make him a good assistant. Like Crabtree, Dr. Ogden is a great supporter of Murdoch's methods. Her skill in pathology usually helps by revealing a great deal of useful evidence to aid Murdoch in solving cases. Throughout the series, Murdoch's growing infatuation with her, and his inability to express his feelings, provide a light subplot. In the fifth season, after Dr. Ogden is married to Dr. Darcy Garland (a colleague she met in Buffalo), a new doctor is introduced, Doctor Emily Grace (Georgina Reilly). She and George Crabtree show some romantic interest in each other.

Real history is an important element in most episodes, and the plots, though fictitious, sometimes involve real people, such as Buffalo Bill Cody, Annie Oakley, H G Wells, Nikola Tesla, Wilfrid Laurier, Jack London, Arthur Conan Doyle, Queen Victoria, Theodore Roosevelt, Oliver Mowat, Orville and Wilbur Wright, Henry Ford, Sir Winston Churchill, Bat Masterson, Alexander Graham Bell, Emma Goldman, H. P. Lovecraft, Harry Houdini, Thomas Edison and Helen Keller. Future events are often foreshadowed. For example, it is implied that secret British-American government co-operation has produced a highly advanced aircraft similar to an airship, and Crabtree and Murdoch allude to the building of a secret government facility in Nevada and New Mexico "at Concession 51" (an allusion to Area 51). Characters also refer to actual inventions of the 19th century and extrapolate from them to future inventions such as microwave ovens, night-vision goggles, computers, the games "Cluedo" (marketed as "Clue" in the U.S.) and "Hangman", the toy Silly Putty, and a silencer for small arms.

Another underlying theme of the series involves the fact that Murdoch is a Roman Catholic in what was at the time a predominantly Protestant city and the prejudices that he occasionally encounters as a result. Other subplots that overarch multiple episodes include women's suffrage movement in Canada, a movement that was taking place during the time the series is set in, and the discrimination towards racial minorities in Toronto and same-sex relationships during that time period.

History 

The series has its origins in 2004 as a three episode made-for-TV movie, starring Peter Outerbridge in the lead role. Its original title at that time was Murder 19C: The Detective Murdoch Mysteries. In 2006, a thirteen-episode series based on the novels was picked up, but there were questions about Outerbridge's continuing availability, since he was already starring in another series, ReGenesis. By 2007, Yannick Bisson became the lead in what was now called Murdoch Mysteries.

The series debuted on Citytv on January 20, 2008. The program was well received, both by the audience and by the critics: in the summer of 2008, it was nominated for fourteen Gemini Awards by the Academy of Canadian Cinema and Television. Critics were surprised, however, that Bisson was not among the nominees. The critics were also surprised in November when Murdoch Mysteries won only two Geminis.

Meanwhile, Murdoch Mysteries was renewed for four more seasons between 2009 and 2012. In 2010 the program, which had previously been filmed only in Canada, went to Bristol, England, to film an episode. One big fan of the show was Canadian Prime Minister Stephen Harper, who agreed to play a small role in one of that season's episodes. The episode in which he appeared, playing a "clueless cop who fails to recognize then prime minister Wilfrid Laurier", aired in late July 2011.

After Rogers Media decided not to continue the series beyond its fifth season, CBC Television  picked up the show for its sixth season, which premiered in January 2013. The network has subsequently renewed the series repeatedly on a season-to-season basis. It has been one of the CBC's most highly rated programs, regularly watched by more than 1.4 million viewers as of January 2014. In the U.S. season 12 aired on Ovation starting in April 2019, back under its original title of Murdoch Mysteries. Season 13 started in the U.S. in December 2019, on Acorn TV.

Episodes

Guest stars 

Murdoch Mysteries has, at times, been known for using stunt casting of famous actors or non-actor personalities in guest roles. Noted examples have included Stephen Harper, at the time the Prime Minister of Canada, in a small role as a police desk clerk; William Shatner portraying writer Mark Twain; a special Christmas episode which included appearances by Ed Asner, Brendan Coyle, Kelly Rowan and television news anchor Peter Mansbridge; an episode which featured David Onley, the Lieutenant Governor of Ontario at the time of production, appearing as his own forerunner Oliver Mowat; and two different episodes in which former Dragons' Den investors Arlene Dickinson and David Chilton guest starred. Dickinson portrayed a business magnate named Miss Dickinson and Chilton a character named Mr. Chilton (aka the "Wealthy Barber").

In 2013, Murdoch Mysteries aired a fictional crossover with another CBC Television crime drama, Republic of Doyle. With the two shows set over 100 years apart, Allan Hawco appeared on the November 25, 2013, episode of Murdoch Mysteries as Jacob Doyle, a 19th-century ancestor of his regular character Jake Doyle, while Bisson appeared on the January 29, 2014, episode of Republic of Doyle as Detective Bill Murdoch, a 21st-century descendant of Detective William Murdoch. The end of the latter episode references the previous episode.

In 2017, Colin Mochrie appeared on Murdoch Mysteries as a hotel detective, after joking on Twitter that he was the only Canadian actor left who had never done a guest spot on the show.

Production 

Murdoch Mysteries is produced and developed by Shaftesbury Films in association with Citytv, ITV Studios Global Entertainment, UKTV and with the assistance of the Canadian Film or Video Production Tax Credit, the Ontario Film and Television Tax Credit, and the Canadian Television Fund. It features the distinctive theme music of the composer Robert Carli.

Prior to being picked up as a regular weekly series, three television movies, Except the Dying, Poor Tom Is Cold and Under the Dragon's Tail, aired on Bravo Canada in 2004. These films starred Peter Outerbridge as William Murdoch, Matthew MacFadzean as George Crabtree, Keeley Hawes as Julia Ogden, and Colm Meaney as Inspector Brackenreid.

Seasons one and two were filmed at the Toronto Film Studios facility on Eastern Avenue in Toronto. However, that facility was closed at the end of 2008, forcing the third season to be filmed elsewhere in Toronto, in the area near Kipling Subway to the west of the city.

For seasons one, two and three, filming locations included the Galt district of Cambridge, Ontario. Sidewalks and driveways were covered in earth, and in season one the Dobbie Mansion was used for about a week of indoor filming. Parts of the opening episode of season three were filmed in Bristol in England.

In August 2010 production on the fourth season began and continued through November 2010 with filming in Toronto and Hamilton. Canadian Prime Minister Stephen Harper filmed a cameo appearance as a constable in the fourth season on October 15, 2010, when he visited the set with his daughter.

Filming of season five began in July 2011 and included a visit to Dawson City in the Yukon. In September 2011, Rogers Media decided not to continue with Murdoch Mysteries beyond the fifth season. In response to the cancellation of the series Christina Jennings, executive producer and CEO of Shaftesbury Films said: 

Murdoch Mysteries was described as an "odd fit" for Citytv's schedule, which consists of more contemporary, urban hip, imported programming. Shaftesbury's British partners in the production of the series, broadcaster UKTV and the international distributor ITV Studios Global Entertainment, were both interested in additional seasons. Christina Jennings approached Kirstine Stewart, executive vice-president of CBC's English services, about continuing the series, and she felt that "a home at CBC made absolute sense". Reports of the change of broadcasters and commitment for a sixth season appeared in the evening of November 15 with the press releases being issued on November 16. Production of the sixth season began in April 2012 to be ready for CBC in September 2012, but later the premiere for season six was changed to January 2013, and instead an encore of season five aired in September. Production of the 13th season started in May 2019.

On June 1, 2022, CBC announced the sixteenth season, which again will have twenty four episodes.

Web series 

In addition to the regular television series, several short run web series have also been created under the Murdoch Mysteries banner.

In 2011, Murdoch Mysteries: The Curse of the Lost Pharaohs debuted on citytv.com, blending live action and animation to depict a storyline in which Crabtree, Murdoch, Dr. Ogden and Inspector Brackenreid were forced to battle mummies who were attempting to kill Queen Victoria.<ref>[http://www.canadaonscreen.ca/productions/television/murdoch_mysteries_the_curse_of_the_lost_pharaohs canadaonscreen.ca Murdoch Mysteries: The Curse of the Lost Pharaohs] . Canada on Screen.</ref> The storyline of the webseries was also integrated into the regular television series; within the main television plot Crabtree, as an aspiring writer, spent much of the season working on The Curse of the Lost Pharaohs as a fantasy novel manuscript. The Curse of the Lost Pharaohs garnered nominations for Best Digital Program: Fiction at the 2012 Emmy Awards, Cross-Platform Project, Fiction at the 2012 Banff World Media Festival and Cross-Platform Project, Fiction at the 1st Canadian Screen Awards.

The 2012 season web series The Murdoch Effect featured a time travel plotline in which William Murdoch suddenly found himself transported to the 21st century, and had to solve a case with eerie parallels to one he was investigating in his own timeline.

The 2013 series Nightmare on Queen Street featured an interactive story in which the viewer was called upon to solve the case by piecing together clues from each webisode. This series also garnered a nomination for Best Cross-Platform Project, Fiction at the 2nd Canadian Screen Awards.

 Broadcast 

In Australia, Murdoch Mysteries airs on 13th Street Monday to Friday at 7:30 pm, with the latest series also airing at 7:30 pm on Saturdays. In 2017, Channel 7two ran three episodes back to back every Thursday night commencing from 8.30 pm.

The series airs in the United Kingdom on Alibi (formerly known as UKTV Drama).

In the United States, Murdoch Mysteries is broadcast on several digital subchannel networks, streaming services and even some local network affiliates:

 Episodes of Murdoch Mysteries are broadcast on several networks, usually at night or early in the morning on weekends with some episode overlap. Digital subchannel networks such as Retro TV and NBC's Cozi TV subchannel provide broadcasts at various dates and times.
 American Public Television acquired the first season of Murdoch Mysteries from ITV Global Entertainment in 2009 for broadcast syndication to public-television stations throughout the U.S.
 Genesis International took over the American syndication rights to Murdoch Mysteries after they acquired the rights from ITV Studios Global Entertainment and American Public Television in mid-summer 2014 for broadcast syndication to commercial television stations in the U.S. Like the digital subchannel networks, several of these stations, including ABC network flagship WABC-TV in New York City, WFMZ-TV in Pennsylvania's Lehigh Valley region, KHOU in Houston and WEWS-TV in Cleveland, also carry the show overnights during the early morning hours.
 The series began airing on the Ovation cable TV network in 2013 under the title The Artful Detective. Starting with Season 12, the show will now go by its original name of Murdoch Mysteries on Ovation. The network also shared the series with the Fox Broadcasting Company on certain stations on Sundays at 2AM ET until June 2020 when it was removed from some stations. In late July 2020, ION TV's ION Plus network picked up the series and started airing it on Sundays. The series also available to stream all seasons on Acorn TV.
 , Seasons 1–6 are being streamed on the Hulu video, on-demand subscription service.
 In 2013, Acorn.tv began showing the first seven seasons on its online premium service and made Season 8 available in 2015.
 Amazon Prime made the series available adding season 8 in 2015.

In France, the series is shown on France 3 and has been retitled Les Enquêtes de Murdoch (Murdoch Investigations).

In Greece, Murdoch Mysteries airs on ERT2 under the title Ντετέκτιβ Μέρντοχ (Detective Murdoch) on Saturday and Sunday at 9:00 pm

 Home video releases 

Acorn Media has released ten seasons of Murdoch Mysteries'' on DVD and Blu-ray in North America and Australia.

ITV Studios Home Entertainment has released four seasons on DVD in the UK and has also released a box set of the seasons 1–3. Season 4 onward, are available through Amazon UK, but in Region 1 format only. The first seven seasons are available for home viewing via streaming from Acorn.

DVDs

Blu-ray

Season sets

TV movies

Christmas Special

References

External links 

 
 Murdoch Mysteries at Alibi
 The Artful Detective at Ovation
 

2008 Canadian television series debuts
2000s Canadian crime drama television series
2010s Canadian crime drama television series
Canadian mystery television series
Detective television series
Television series set in the 1890s
Television series set in the 1900s
Television series revived after cancellation
Television shows set in Toronto
Television shows filmed in Toronto
Television series by Shaftesbury Films
Television series by ITV Studios
CBC Television original programming
Citytv original programming
Victorian era in popular culture
2020s Canadian crime drama television series
Canadian historical television series